Paratopula is a genus of ants in the subfamily Myrmicinae. The genus consists of arboreal species known from the Oriental and Indo-Australian regions. Little is known about their biology.

Species
Paratopula andamanensis (Forel, 1903)
Paratopula ankistra Bolton, 1988
Paratopula catocha Bolton, 1988
Paratopula ceylonica (Emery, 1901)
Paratopula demeta Bolton, 1988
Paratopula intermedia Sheela & Narendran, 1998
Paratopula longispina (Stitz, 1938)
Paratopula macta Bolton, 1988
Paratopula oculata (Smith, 1857)
Paratopula sumatrensis (Forel, 1913)
Paratopula zhengi Xu & Xu, 2011

References

External links

Myrmicinae
Ant genera